Asiático is an alcoholic drink made out of coffee, it is typical from the Spanish city of Cartagena and very representative of the cuisine of the Campo de Cartagena.

Recipe 

The original recipe consists of coffee with condensed milk and cognac; a few drops of Licor 43 as well as a couple of coffee beans, lemon rind and cinnamon may be added, but it is usual to find it without the grains of coffee and lemon peel. It is commonly served in a special glass, thicker than usual to avoid thermal collapse of it, and whose design is inspired by the one manufactured at the ancient Glass Factory of St. Lucia in Cartagena. This new glass replaced the glass of vermouth that was originally used because of its greater resistance, and since 1945 is the company Jose Diaz is in charge of its manufacturing and commercialization.

History 
The origin of the recipe as we know it today dates back to the 1940s, when it was prepared by Pedro Conesa Ortega in his bar at Albujón in Cartagena, the "Pedrín" bar. The drink however was already known before, with different variations, by the fishermen of Cartagena, who used to carry with them poor quality coffee (known as " recuelo"), brandy and milk, which helped them keep warm and clear during the fishing time. At the beginning the drink was called "Ruso" (Russian), although its name was replaced by the current, "Asiático" (Asian), due to the political connotations for the first one in a time in Spain when the word was associated with the old Russia from the Soviet Union.
 
At present the City Council seeks to promote the drink as a symbol of the city in order to exploit it as a typical item for tourists, for which information campaigns are conducted within the local businesses.

References

External links 

 Asian Coffee
 Classic cocktails – Café Asiático

Cartagena, Spain
Spanish liqueurs
Liqueurs
Alcoholic coffee drinks